Galina Ivanovna Zybina (born 22 January 1931) is a retired Soviet and Russian athlete and coach. She competed in the shot put at the 1952, 1956, 1960 and 1964 Olympics and finished in first, second, seventh and third place, respectively; in 1952 she also finished fourth in the javelin throw. Between 1952 and 1956, she set eight consecutive world records and 14 national records in the shot put. In 1953, she became the first woman to throw over 16 meters when she threw 16.20 m.

Biography 
As a child Zybina was much weakened by hunger and cold during the Siege of Leningrad in World War II, which killed her mother and brother, while her father died at the front lines. Yet, by 1950, she had become a top Soviet thrower and won a bronze in the javelin at the European championships. During her entire career as a competitor and coach Zybina accentuated on technique rather than strength. Owing to her age, she was left out of the Soviet team before the 1968 Olympics and retired in 1969, although she was still the second-best Soviet shot putter at the time. In retirement she worked as athletics coach in Värska, Estonia, which was then under the Soviet occupation.

Zybina was married to Yury Fyodorov, a Russian captain and commander of the Russian cruiser Aurora in 1964–85. The cruiser was famous for starting the 1917 October Revolution, but by 1960s was a museum ship. In 1959 she gave birth to a son, which caused her to demonstrate a sub-par performance at the 1960 Olympics (seventh place).

References 

1931 births
Living people
Athletes from Saint Petersburg
Soviet female shot putters
Olympic athletes of the Soviet Union
Athletes (track and field) at the 1952 Summer Olympics
Athletes (track and field) at the 1956 Summer Olympics
Athletes (track and field) at the 1960 Summer Olympics
Athletes (track and field) at the 1964 Summer Olympics
Honoured Masters of Sport of the USSR
Recipients of the Order of the Red Banner of Labour
Olympic gold medalists for the Soviet Union
Olympic silver medalists for the Soviet Union
Olympic bronze medalists for the Soviet Union
European Athletics Championships medalists
Medalists at the 1964 Summer Olympics
Medalists at the 1956 Summer Olympics
Medalists at the 1952 Summer Olympics
Olympic gold medalists in athletics (track and field)
Olympic silver medalists in athletics (track and field)
Olympic bronze medalists in athletics (track and field)